Arif Satya Yudha Alkanza (born 16 May 1998) is an Indonesian professional footballer who plays as a central or attacking midfielder for Liga 2 club PSIM Yogyakarta.

Career

PSS Sleman
He was signed for PSS Sleman to play in Liga 1. Alkanza made his league debut on 2 November 2019 in a match against PSIS Semarang at the Maguwoharjo Stadium, Sleman.

PSIM Yogyakarta
He was signed for PSIM Yogyakarta to play in Liga 2 in the 2020 season. This season was suspended on 27 March 2020 due to the COVID-19 pandemic. The season was abandoned and was declared void on 20 January 2021.

Career statistics

Club

References

External links
 Yudha Alkanza at Soccerway
 Yudha Alkanza at Liga Indonesia

1997 births
Living people
Indonesian footballers
PSS Sleman players
Association football midfielders
Persiba Bantul players
PSIM Yogyakarta players
People from Bantul Regency